Jason Peter Kane is a  fictional character from Virgin Publishing's range of original full-length Doctor Who novels, the New Adventures. The New Adventures were fully licensed novels carrying on from where the Doctor Who television series had left off. Jason was introduced in Dave Stone's novel Death and Diplomacy in 1996.

In-universe Character history

The character, Jason, is born on Christmas Eve 1983 and grew up around London. Jason's father, Peter, is abusive towards Jason and his sister. Because of this, Jason runs away from his home. In 1996, when Jason is 13 years old, he is caught in an alien transportation beam, which deposits him in a swamp on the planet t'Kao in the 26th century. After thirteen years, the first human being he sees is Bernice "Benny" Summerfield. They fall in love and get married, but after a turbulent relationship they soon get divorced. When he first meets Benny, and they discuss their sex lives, Jason candidly discusses having slept with nine women, five men and a number of (to varying degrees) humanoid aliens.

Jason became a romantic foil for the recurring character of Benny, with their marriage being the centrepiece for the New Adventure Happy Endings (by Paul Cornell), itself celebrating the whole New Adventures line as its fiftieth book. We see them as a happily married couple in Return of the Living Dad. However, when the BBC withdrew the Doctor Who licence, the New Adventures planned to continue with Benny as the lead character and an editorial decision was taken to split up Benny and Jason, as depicted in Eternity Weeps.

The Benny-led New Adventures launched with Benny a single woman, but Jason remained an intermittently recurring character. He remarries in Deadfall, but his new wife does not appear again in the series. When the New Adventures came to an end, Jason was trapped in an alternative dimension regarded as the equivalent of Hell, but Benny's adventures continued with an ongoing series of novels and audio dramas by Big Finish Productions and, through an agreement with creator Dave Stone, Jason re-appeared. The character is portrayed by Stephen Fewell in the audio dramas. The Big Finish series has restarted Benny's relationship with Jason, but it is strongly implied in The End of the World that he has been killed.

The Virgin Missing Adventures novel Burning Heart (also by Stone) hints that Jason and Benny may at one point had children. In the novel, the Sixth Doctor and Peri journey to the 32nd century and meet a man named Kane, who expected the Doctor to recognise him. Kane's first name (never revealed) is "one of those...that were unisexual".

References

External links

Literary characters introduced in 1996
Doctor Who book characters
Bernice Summerfield
Fictional bisexual males
Doctor Who spin-off companions
Male characters in literature
Fictional LGBT characters in literature